Per Rosengren (born 1951) is a Swedish Left Party politician and teacher, and a member of the Riksdag from 1994–2006. He represented the constituency of Västra Götaland County East. He is currently a member of the National Audit Board.

References
 Per Rosengren (Swedish Riksdag page).. Accessed 2010-01-26.

Members of the Riksdag from the Left Party (Sweden)
Living people
1951 births
Members of the Riksdag 2002–2006
Members of the Riksdag 1994–1998
Members of the Riksdag 1998–2002